Yagnam (English: The Offering) is a 1991 Indian Telugu-language social problem film directed by Gutha Ramineedu based on a 1964 play by Kalipatnam Ramarao. The film has garnered the National Film Award for Best Supporting Actor, and the Nandi Award for Best Feature Film. The film won two Nandi Awards.

Plot
The film deals with the life of a poor farmer (P. L. Narayana) and his dysfunctional family. The farmer sacrifices his own son (Bhanu Chander) as an offering to overcome his debt.

Awards
National Film Awards
National Film Award for Best Supporting Actor - P. L. Narayana

Nandi Awards
Best Feature Film - Gold - Gutha Ramineedu
Second Best Story Writer - Kalipatnam Ramarao

References

1991 films
1990s Telugu-language films
Telugu films remade in other languages
Films set in Andhra Pradesh
Films shot in Andhra Pradesh
Films featuring a Best Supporting Actor National Film Award-winning performance
Films shot in Hyderabad, India
Films about dysfunctional families
Films about farmers' suicides in India
Films about social issues in India
Films directed by Gutha Ramineedu